Ajay Kalsi (born October 1960) is an Indian billionaire businessman, the owner of a range of companies in oil and gas, footwear, commodity trading, real estate and business process outsourcing.

Early life
Ajay Kalsi was born in October 1960, educated at the Scindia School, and received a bachelor's degree in economics from the London School of Economics followed by a master's degree in economics from Cambridge University.

Career
Kalsi inherited a shoe business in Kanpur, India from his family.

Kalsi founded Indus Gas, and is its CEO. He is the chairman of Focus Energy Limited. He has been a director of Indus Gas since April 2008 and is a director of Focus Energy Limited. Kalsi was a director of Phoenix International Ltd from April to December 2006. He is a member of the World Economic Forum, where he has been designated a "Global Leader of Tomorrow".

As of November 2011, Kalsi and his wife owned 70% of Indus Gas, having sold 30% in January 2011, following a listing on London's Alternate Investment Market.

As of March 2015, Kalsi's net worth is estimated to be $1.2 billion, according to Forbes.

Personal life
Kalsi is married and lives in Delhi, India. In 2011, he was building a new wave pool for his daughter, the size of four Olympic swimming pools.

References

1960 births
Living people
Alumni of the London School of Economics
Alumni of the University of Cambridge
Indian billionaires